"Snow on the Beach" is a song by American singer-songwriter Taylor Swift, featuring American singer-songwriter Lana Del Rey. The fourth track of Swift's tenth studio album Midnights (2022), "Snow on the Beach" was written by Swift, Jack Antonoff, and Del Rey, with the first two producing it. It peaked at number four on the US Billboard Hot 100, marking the highest peak of Del Rey's career on the chart. Musically, "Snow on the Beach" is a dream pop ballad about two people falling in love with each other simultaneously.

Background and release 

On August 28, 2022, Taylor Swift announced her tenth studio album, Midnights, set for release on October 21, 2022; its track-list was not immediately revealed. Jack Antonoff, a longtime collaborator of Swift, who had worked with her since her fifth studio album 1989 (2014), was confirmed as a producer on Midnights by a video posted to Swift's Instagram account on September 16, 2022, titled "The making of Midnights." Antonoff had also collaborated with Lana Del Rey on two of her studio albums and a spoken word album, Norman Fucking Rockwell! (2019), Violet Bent Backwards over the Grass (2020) and Chemtrails over the Country Club (2021).

On September 21, 2022, Swift began unveiling the Midnights track-list in a randomized order through a short video series on TikTok, titled Midnights Mayhem with Me. Consisting of 13 episodes, Swift announces a song title with each episode by rolling a lottery cage containing 13 ping pong balls numbered from one to thirteen, each representing a track of Midnights. When a ball drops out, she announces the title of the corresponding track on the album through a telephone. In the final episode, on October 7, 2022, Swift announces the fourth track, "Snow on the Beach", and that it features Del Rey.

Composition 
"Snow on the Beach" is a dream pop ballad with a length of four minutes and sixteen seconds. The instrumental of the song contains strings that have been compared to "hazy holiday music". The song references Janet Jackson's "All for You" (2001).

Writing and recording 
In a video posted to her Instagram account, Swift said "Snow on the Beach" is about the dream-like state of "falling in love with someone at the same time as they’re falling in love with you" and that she compared the rarity of such love to a natural phenomenon of snowing on a beach. She also said it features Del Rey because Del Rey is one of Swift's favorite music artists.

Commercial performance 
"Snow on the Beach" earned over 15 million plays in its first 24 hours on Spotify, logging the biggest opening day for a female collaboration in the platform's history, surpassing Lady Gaga and Ariana Grande's "Rain on Me". In the United States, tracks from Midnights occupied the entire top-10 of the Billboard Hot 100; "Snow on the Beach" debuted at number four on the chart with 37.2 million streams and 2,600 digital downloads sold. Swift became the first artist to simultaneously occupy the top-10 spots of the Billboard Hot 100 chart; the female artist with the most top-10 songs (40); and the first artist to occupy the entire top-10 of the Hot 100, Streaming Songs, and Digital Songs charts simultaneously. The song marked Del Rey's first top-five entry on the Hot 100 and her second top-10 song after "Summertime Sadness" (2012).

Credits and personnel 
Credits adapted from Pitchfork and the liner notes of Midnights.
Recording
 Recorded at Rough Customer Studio (Brooklyn), Electric Lady Studios (New York City), and Henson Recording Studio (Los Angeles)
 Mixed at MixStar Studios (Virginia Beach)
 Mastered at Sterling Sound (Edgewater, New Jersey)
 Bobby Hawk's performance was recorded by Dave Gross at Blue Plate Records (Hayworth, New Jersey)
 Evan Smith's performance was recorded by herself at Pleasure Hill Recording (Portland, Maine)

Personnel
 Taylor Swift – vocals, songwriter, producer
 Lana Del Rey – vocals, songwriter
 Jack Antonoff – songwriter, producer, engineer, synths, drums, programming, percussion, Juno 6, mellotron, acoustic and electric guitars, bass, background vocals
 Evan Smith – engineer, synths, recording
 Bobby Hawk – violin
 Dylan O'Brien – drums
 Laura Sisk – engineer
 Dave Gross – engineer, recording
 Megan Searl – assistant engineer
 Jon Sher – assistant engineer
 John Rooney – assistant engineer
 Jacob Spitzer – assistant engineer
 Serban Ghenea – mix engineer
 Bryce Bordone – assistant mix engineer
 Randy Merrill – mastering engineer

Charts

Certifications

References 

2022 songs
2020s ballads
Pop ballads
Songs written by Taylor Swift
Songs written by Lana Del Rey
Songs written by Jack Antonoff
Song recordings produced by Taylor Swift
Song recordings produced by Jack Antonoff
Taylor Swift songs
Lana Del Rey songs